The King Fahad Industrial Port (Yanbu) is a Saudi port located in Yanbu city of Saudi Arabia on the Red sea coast. It is the largest port for loading the crude oil and petrochemicals in the Red Sea.

Specification 
King Fahad Industrial Port has a total length of 25 km and an area of 50 km2. The port has 34 berths with a capacity of 210 million tons per year. There are three terminals in the port; General Cargo and Containers Terminal, Bulk Cargo Terminal, and Crude Oil Terminal.

See also 

 Saudi Ports Authority
Yanbu Commercial Port

References 

Ports and harbours of Saudi Arabia